HavenCo Limited was a data haven, data hosting services company, founded in 2000 to operate from Sealand, a self-declared sovereign principality that occupies a man-made former World War II defensive facility originally known as Roughs Tower located approximately six miles from the coast of Suffolk, southeast England.

In November 2008, operations of HavenCo ceased without explanation.

Founding 
On 22 August 2000, Michael Bates of Leigh-on-sea, Essex- also known as Prince Michael of Sealand- bought a dormant British company which was renamed HavenCo Limited. It was given the registration number of 04056934 by Companies House, an executive agency of the UK Department of Trade and Industry. The registered office of HavenCo Limited was recorded at 11 Kintyre House, Cold Harbour, London, E14 9NL England. The directors were listed as Michael Roy Bates, a citizen of the United Kingdom, who was named Chief Operating Officer, and Ryan Donald Lackey, a US citizen. Other founders included Sean Hastings, Jo Hastings, Avi Freedman, and Sameer Parekh was an advisor to the company. The company later relocated its registration to Cyprus.

HavenCo initially received broad coverage in the international media, appearing on the cover of Wired Magazine, in over 200 press articles, and in several television reports. In these reports, HavenCo claimed to have established a secure colocation facility on Sealand, and that it had commenced operations as a data haven. Detractors claim that these reports gave the impression that HavenCo was registered on Sealand itself, and that the company would issue domain names under the authority of that entity, whereas it had no entitlement to do so.

Services 
The company announced that it had become operational in December 2000 and that its Acceptable Use Policy prohibited child pornography, spamming, and malicious hacking, but that all other content was acceptable. It claimed that it had no restrictions on copyright or intellectual property for data hosted on its servers, arguing that as Sealand was not a member of the World Trade Organization or WIPO, international intellectual property law did not apply. Other services available from HavenCo at the time included IT consulting, systems administration, offshore software development, and electronic mail services. Later policies specified, "No pornography that would be considered illegal within the EU," and "No infringement of copyright."

Ryan Lackey left HavenCo under acrimonious circumstances in 2002, citing disagreements with the Bates family over management of the company.  The HavenCo website went offline in 2008.

In 2013, Freedman announced plans for HavenCo to resume operation: offering proxies, VPNs, and other services using servers in the European Union and the United States, while storing encryption keys and other cold data in Sealand.

References

External links 

Sealand, HavenCo, and the Rule of Law, James Grimmelmann, March 2012, University of Illinois Law Review, Volume 2012, Number 2
"Has 'haven' for questionable sites sunk?" - A News.com article from August 4, 2003

Video - From The Daily Show with Jon Stewart

Computer law organizations
Companies based in Suffolk
Principality of Sealand
2000 establishments in Europe
2008 disestablishments in Europe